DeporTV is the Azteca Uno´s sports news program produced by TV Azteca. This program provides an overview of the day, soccer, boxing, wrestling and other sports. Started in 1974, is one of the programs of Mexican TV sports coverage more vintage of Mexico. Conducted by Jose Ramon Fernandez until the year 2006 the show took like his motto the phrase "El Ancho Mundo del Deporte" and used the logo of the ABC´S Wide World of Sports with the show's own logo.

The show was conducted with José Ramón Fernández many sports anchors: Raul Orvañanos, Antonio Moreno, Francisco Javier Gonzalez, David Faitelson, Ciro Procuna, Alejandro Lara Licea who introduces the program with the phrase "Esto es DeporTV"(This is DeporTV).

The show adopts like his theme the Emerson, Lake and Palmer´s version of Aaron Copland´s Fanfare for the Common Man until 1990. Between 1999 and 2003 the show adopts the David Arkenstone piece "The Journey Begins" that TV Azteca choose for his intro for the 1998 FIFA World Cup one year earlier.

Azteca Uno original programming
Television series by TV Azteca